The Hiroshima Maidens ((Genbaku otome);  "atomic bomb maidens") are a group of 25 Japanese women who were school age girls when they were seriously disfigured as a result of the thermal flash of the fission bomb dropped on Hiroshima on the morning of August 6, 1945. They subsequently went on a highly publicized journey to get reconstructive surgery in the US in 1955.

Keloid scars from their burns marred their faces and many of their hand burns healed into bent claw-like positions. These women, as well as the other citizens affected by the A-bomb, were referred to as hibakusha, meaning "explosion-affected people".

Creation
By 1951, Hiroshima bomb survivor Shigeko Niimoto had endured several unsuccessful Japanese operations to repair scarring on her face. Following a Christian church meeting with Reverend Kiyoshi Tanimoto, he invited her to a meeting of bomb-affected people. Upon arriving and finding the meetings discussion too political for her tastes, Niimoto suggested to Rev. Tanimoto that they form a support group for the dozen or so young women who he knew with similar injuries and concerns. Soon they were meeting regularly in the basement of his church. The women had all experienced similar lives following the war, such as being hidden from view by parents, stared at when they ventured outside, unwanted by employers, and rejected as potential wives for fear they were genetically damaged. As Tanimoto had gained some fame in America as a subject of a celebrated 1946 magazine/book article by journalist John Hersey titled Hiroshima, Tanimoto joined American journalists to create a charitable foundation to help victims of Hiroshima and "explore the ways of peace".

Hersey, Pearl S. Buck, Norman Cousins and Reverend Marvin Green were Tanimoto's partners in the Hiroshima Peace Centre Foundation.

The group of scarred women was one of the foundation's projects, with Tanimoto calling it the Society of Keloid Girls. Following the help from newspaper columnist, Shizue Masugi, Tanimoto began raising funds to get plastic surgery for his group. Newspapers dubbed them genbaku otome, or "atomic bomb maidens", and in 1952 about 20 of them were treated in Tokyo and Osaka. Plastic surgery in Japan was not as advanced as it was in the United States so Tanimoto tried to find a way to get the "maidens" to America. Once aware of his efforts, Saturday Review editor Norman Cousins pledged to help Tanimoto. They found two doctors, William Maxwell Hitzig and Arthur Barsky of Mount Sinai Hospital, New York, who were willing to supervise the medical operations, however Cousins suffered multiple rejections for financial support to transport the women to America. Janet E. Tobitt, the former Director of the Far East American Girl Scout Association in Japan, suggested he make an appeal to the editor of the Nippon Times. Cousins acted on Tobitt's suggestion, and consequently General John E. Hull of the U.S. Far East Command agreed to provide air transportation for the women.

On May 5, 1955, a group of 25 women in their teens and twenties departed for America. The more specific nickname for the group – the Hiroshima Maidens – caught on when the women were brought to New York to undergo multiple reconstructive surgeries at Mount Sinai Hospital. This highly publicized turn of events was largely the work of Cousins, an outspoken advocate of nuclear disarmament. Tobitt, together with C. Frank Ortloff of the Religious Society of Friends, was in charge of the “very substantial problem of out-of-hospital care” which involved the women staying in private homes in New York City as they prepared for, or recuperated from, multiple operations.

Media in the West
Following their arrival, Tanimoto was the subject of the US TV program This Is Your Life on May 11, 1955. Before a studio audience, guests came forward to illustrate pivotal moments in Tanimoto's life. In the line-up were two of the Hiroshima maidens, their faces hidden behind a screen, and most surprising Captain Robert Lewis, the co-pilot of the plane, the Enola Gay, that dropped the Little Boy bomb on Hiroshima. 
In all, 138 surgeries were performed on 25 women over 18 months during their stay in the US. On their visit, the women lived at Pendle Hill a Quaker retreat center in Wallingford, PA. Hiroko Tasaka, heard in the following Canadian Broadcasting Company (CBC) clip, was known as "Champion Surgery Girl" because she had 13 operations, more than anyone else. One maiden, Tomoko Nakabayashi, died of cardiac arrest while undergoing a reconstruction operation on 24 May 1956; the cause was declared by the doctors to have been from complications/errors in the operation, not from radiation effects.

Atomic Bomb Maidens
Not all the atomic bomb maidens left for the US. Miyoko Matsubara states that she was one of 16 young "Hiroshima maidens" who received surgeries in Tokyo and then Osaka in 1953. After the 10 successful operations, together with 2 other Hiroshima maidens, they were then well enough and thus started work as live-in caretakers to disadvantaged children. When time came in 1955 to travel to Mt. Sinai Hospital in the US, unlike her two colleagues, she did not feel comfortable traveling to the country that bombed her and was "left behind alone".

None of the nearly equally disfigured young women at Nagasaki following the Fat Man fission bomb explosion on August 9, 1945, were in the group. There was no comparative Nagasaki Maiden charity organization: there was an effort from US cities to sponsor scarred survivors to travel to receive medical treatment, but this move is said to have been derailed by the US government. Moreover, when the women traveled to the US, three Hiroshima surgeons came along, to study the American plastic surgery techniques. This medical training was done free of charge. 

Presumably there were as many scarred boys/young men as there were girls/young women from the Little Boy bomb at Hiroshima, who also could not marry and were forced to live in the "twilight society of Hiroshima". However, they did not receive the same level of media and medical attention as the young women did. The use of the term "maiden" reveals the focus was on their attempts to attain romantic prospects with men.

Life after reconstruction

A number of the maidens married and became mothers. Some gravitated towards social work. Toyoko Morita attended Parsons School of Design, and later became a well known fashion designer in Japan.

One maiden, Masako Tachibana, married and moved to Canada. She was not able to have children. On August 1, 1995, she gave an interview to
reporter Len Grant of CBC Television. She said although she was a schoolgirl ordered to demolish buildings to create firebreaks at the time of the bombing, and the bomb's flash ignited her clothes on fire, and it made her vomit (a symptom of acute radiation syndrome) – she was glad the US had dropped the bomb. Tachibana said it was justified because it brought the war to a quicker resolution: Without it she does not believe the Japanese would have surrendered. Instead, more lives would have been lost, possibly close to all of Japan's population. She is the author of the Japanese book Reaction to the flash.

, 164,621 living hibakusha were certified by the Japanese government, with an average age of 81.41. The number of living Hiroshima maidens/atomic bomb maidens is not generally published separately.

List
Yoshue Harada
Misako Kannabe
Tomoko Nakabayashi
Shigeko Niimoto
Suzue Oshima 
Shigeko Sasamori
Masako Tachibana
Hiroko Tasaka
Atsuko Yamamoto
Michiko Yamaoka
Miyoko Matsubara (did not travel to the US)

In popular culture 
The Hiroshima Maidens have been the subject of a movie titled Hiroshima Maiden (1988), depicting a particular case of such a maiden and the American family with which she stayed.

See also 
Atomic bombings of Hiroshima and Nagasaki
Sadako Sasaki
White Light/Black Rain: The Destruction of Hiroshima and Nagasaki (2007)

References

Further reading
Rodney Barker, The Hiroshima Maidens: A Story of Courage, Compassion, and Survival, New York: Viking Press, 1985
'The Maidens tour Manhattan,' partial group picture taken in Central Park in Collier's, 26 October 1956, p. 92

External links 
 White Light/Black Rain Official Website  (film)
 CBC Archives 1957 broadcast
 1999 Recollections of Miyoko Matsubara, "Hiroshima Maiden".

Maidens
Women in World War II
Japanese women
Anti–nuclear weapons movement
Articles containing video clips
20th-century Japanese women